ConFurence was the first exclusively furry convention, held annually in southern California from 1989 to 2003. The large furry presence at the BayCon science fiction conventions instigated Mark Merlino and Rod O'Riley to throw "furry parties" at Westercon, Baycon, and other west coast sci-fi conventions in the late 80's. This led to the test gathering in 1989, ConFurence Zero.

According to Joe Strike, ConFurence had a more adult vibe than today’s furry conventions.

History
After trying the Red Lion hotel, Confurence 0 was held at the Holiday Inn Bristol Plaza in Costa Mesa, California, on January 21 to 22, 1989. While attendance for this first serious attempt to create a "funny animal fandom" convention was sparse at 65 persons, it was enough to encourage the Californians to attempt a full-fledged furry convention next year. Attendance was doubled to 130 for the first official ConFurence convention in January 1990, proving them right. 

In 1997 Kare 11 reported adult oriented events going on at the convention. At the height of popularity in 1998, ConFurence 9 boasted the then-largest furry convention attendance of 1250. 

Control of the ConFurence convention was transferred to Darrel Exline in 1999, who created a new entity called "The ConFurence Group" to run it, but by 2003 attendance had dwindled to 470, due to increased competition from other regional furry conventions, and petty infighting among different factions of anthropomorphic fandom. The final ConFurence gathering gained notoriety when television crew from The Man Show appeared and attempted to interview attendees on camera.

With the demise of ConFurence, Mark Merlino and Robert Johnson Jr. teamed up to establish Califur in 2004 to continue the tradition of a furry convention in Southern California.

Legacy

ConFurence created the mold by which other furry conventions were to follow, with the successful art show, a masquerade and an emphasis on fan-created content and Guests of Honor. As of 2018 there are  dozens furry conventions and many more meets and gatherings all around the world, due in part to ConFurence's lead.

The name ConFurence is a registered trademark of the ConFurence Group. It is not a generic term for a furry convention, but as the original furry convention, many later cons took similar-sounding names, such as the now defunct ConFurence East (originally called Furtasticon in 1994 and took the name MoreFurCon just before its dissolution in 1997), and the current Eurofurence.

References

External links
ConFurence.com (Now Confurence archive last updated 2017)

Defunct furry conventions
Recurring events established in 1989
Recurring events disestablished in 2003